Schollene is a municipality in the district of Stendal, in Saxony-Anhalt, Germany.

References

Municipalities in Saxony-Anhalt
Stendal (district)